Ruth Brown (subtitled Rock & Roll) is a compilation album by vocalist Ruth Brown featuring tracks recorded between 1949 and 1956 and released on the Atlantic label.

Reception

Allmusic awarded the album 3 stars stating "Ruth Brown at her stinging, assertive, bawdy best, doing the sizzling, innuendo-laden R&B that helped make Atlantic the nation's prime independent during the early days of rock & roll".

Track listing
 "Lucky Lips" (Jerry Leiber, Mike Stoller) – 2:04
 "As Long As I'm Moving" (Charles E. Cahoun) – 2:41
 "Wild Wild Young Men" (A. Nugetre) – 2:30
 "Daddy Daddy" (Rudolph Toombs) – 2:53
 "Mambo Baby" (Rose Marie McCoy, Charles Singleton) – 2:41
 "Teardrops from My Eyes" (Toombs) – 2:54
 "Hello Little Boy" (Ruth Brown) – 2:38
 "(Mama) He Treats Your Daughter Mean" (Johnny Wallace, Herb Lance) – 2:51
 "5-10-15 Hours" (Toombs) – 3:11
 "It's Love Baby" (Ted Jarrett) – 2:40
 "Sentimental Journey" (Les Brown, Ben Homer, Bud Green) – 2:34
 "Old Man River" (Jerome Kern, Oscar Hammerstein II) – 2:12
 "So Long" (Remus Harris, Russ Morgan, Irving Melsher) – 2:36
 "Oh What a Dream" (Chuck Willis) – 2:51

Personnel 
Ruth Brown – vocal with various personnel including:
Dick Cary – alto horn
Bobby Hackett, Taft Jordan, Ed "Tiger" Lewis – trumpet
Will Bradley, Richard Harris – trombone
Peanuts Hucko – clarinet, tenor saxophone
Arnett Cobb, Willis Jackson, Sam Taylor – tenor saxophone
Ernie Caceres, Haywood Henry, Sylvester Thomas, Paul Williams – baritone saxophone
Joe Bushkin, Ernie Hayes, John Lewis, Bu Pleasant, Harry Van Walls –  piano
Rector Bailey, Mickey Baker, John Collins, Eddie Condon – guitar
George Duvivier, Jack Lesberg, Benny Moten, Lloyd Trotman – bass
Sidney Catlett, Connie Kay, Joe Marshall, Noruddin Zafer – drums
The Delta Rhythm Boys, The Rhythmakers – backing vocals

References 

1957 albums
Ruth Brown albums
Atlantic Records albums